Zibad Rural District is a rural district (dehestan) in Kakhk District, Gonabad County, Razavi Khorasan Province, Iran. At the 2006 census, its population was 4,747, in 1,721 families. The rural district has 23 villages.

Zebad (also romanized as Zībad) village was ratified as the center of Zibad Rural District, in 1945 by the parliament division regulation in the Kakhk District, Gonabad County, Razavi Khorasan province, Iran. In the past 50 years due to severe drought, the population has migrated to the cities.

Zibad, meaning beautiful, was a famous ancient place in Shahnameh. According to Shahnameh Ferdowsi (around 1000 AD), it was the place of a famous war called Davazdah Rokh (12 Hero) between Iran and Turan. Zibad also has an ancient qanat that may be more than 1,600 years old.

Sights and attractions 

Zibad is an ancient place with many historical sites.

See also 
 Razavi Khorasan Province
 Zibad
 Davazdah Rokh
 Gonabad
 Kay Khosrow

References

External links

Gonabad County
Rural Districts of Razavi Khorasan Province